People's Artist of the RSFSR (Narodnyj artist RSFSR) was an honorary title granted to Soviet Union artists, including theatre and film directors, choreographers, music performers, and orchestra conductors, who had outstanding achievements in the arts, and who lived in the Russian Soviet Federative Socialist Republic (RSFSR). This title was one rank below Honored Artist of the RSFSR and one above People's Artist of the USSR. 

The title was introduced on 10 August 1931. In 1992, after the Russian SFSR was renamed as the Russian Federation, it was replaced with People's Artist of Russia.

Miscellaneous
This title is not to be confused with the title which is spelled in Russian Народный художник РСФСР, and which was granted for achievements in the visual arts.

References

Awards established in 1931
Awards disestablished in 1992
Honorary titles of the Soviet Union
People's Artists of the RSFSR